So Savoeun (born 1 June 1945) is a Cambodian singer.

Savoeun specializes in the Sarawan style. She was a popular singer in Cambodia during the 1960s and early 1970s. She often performed duets with Meas Samon as well as with Ros Sereysothea, Pen Ran, Eng Nary, Chea Savoeun, Duk Kim Hak and many more artists. 

Before the Khmer Rouge took over Phnom Penh, She fled to Thailand. She and her husband later moved to France. She lives outside of Paris, where she has given concerts. So Savoeun is among the last representatives of the old generation of Cambodian musicians. She appeared in the short French documentary Les Artistes Khmers about Khmer artists in France.

Filmography
She appeared uncredited as a singer in the film The Joy of Living.

References

1945 births
Living people
Cambodian emigrants to France
20th-century Cambodian women singers